Pittosporum tenuifolium is a small evergreen tree endemic to New Zealand – up to  – commonly known as  and black matipo, and by other Māori names  and . Its small, very dark, reddish-purple flowers generally go unnoticed, and are scented only at night. The Latin  means "slender-leaved"

Description
Pittosporum translates to tarry –  – seed – , a reference to the sticky fluid that encases the seeds and  means thin –  – leaf – .

 is a bush or small tree that grows up to around 8–10 metres tall. The trunk is slender (30–40 cm diameter) with a mottled dark grey bark color that progressively turns black towards the tips of the branches

The leaves themselves are usually small – 2–4 cm long by 1–2 cm wide – but can grow up to 7 cm long. The edges are undulated and the leaf shape can range from oval to almost circular. Young leaves are covered in a layer of fine hairs that gets shed as the leaves grow. Adult leaves have a smooth, glossy texture. The colouration of the foliage is a silvery green, darker on the upper side and lighter underneath. The midrib of the leaf and its smaller lateral veins are whiteish and quite visible on the upper side of the leaf.

 has small – around 1 cm in diameter – dark coloured flowers. The colour ranges from dark-red to dark-purple turning almost black as the flowers age. On rare occasions, the colour can be red or yellow. The flowers develop from lateral buds, either individually or in clumps, and can be male or bisexual.

The flowers are filled with nectar and exude a honey scented fragrance in the evenings with the scent being more obvious in slightly damp conditions. This attracts moths and night flying insects, and it is believed these insects help with pollination.

Fertilised flowers develop into small – around 1.2 cm in diameter –  globe shaped fruits. The fruit is covered in a small layer of hairs during early maturation that is progressively discarded as the capsule ripens. In the ripening process the capsule shrinks, hardens up and turns almost black, splitting into two or three segments when ripened. Inside are black seeds, encased in a very sticky substance. The stickiness of the seeds is likely to help with seed dispersal.

Names
Common names include:

Matipo
Black matipo
Rautawhiri Rautāwhiri
Kairaro
Kihihi
Kowhiwhi Kōwhiwhi
Kohukohu
Koihu
Māpauriki
Pōhiri
Pōwhiri
Tāwhiri
Tawiri
Tawhiwhi
Silverleaf
Turpentine-tree
Black birch

Distribution

Natural global range 
 is endemic to New Zealand.

New Zealand range 
 is well spread all over New Zealand, being absent only to the west of the Southern Alps and Stewart Island.

Habitat preferences 
 is found growing wild in coastal and lower mountain forest areas up to an altitude of 900 m.

 grows particularly quickly at forest edges located at the bottom of high terraces, and can also be found growing in riverbeds. It grows readily in forested areas that have been disturbed or in reverting farmland, playing an important role in ecological succession.

Life cycle/Phenology

Most of the plants in the genus Pittosporum are easily propagated from seed, but germination may be slow. In horticultural production, the sticky substance coating the seeds is removed before sowing, as it acts as a germination inhibitor. The seeds are treated to simulate natural conditions for six weeks in order to improve germination rates.

 is a relatively fast growing plant growing from 0.5 metres to 3 metres within five years. The root system is shallow and spread out. These characteristics make it ideal – when used in conjunction with another plants – for use in stream stabilisation and erosion control.

Flowering happens in late spring, from October to November, and the maturation of the fruit happens between mid-summer and autumn, from January to March.

Diet and foraging
 is a hardy plant that can cope with poor conditions – poor soils, droughts and windy environments. It is, however, a light-demanding plant and prefers soils with good drainage in humid climates. Planting it in damp conditions can cause winter leaf drop, which likely explains why  is not found growing on the West Coast of New Zealand. In its role in ecological succession,  is often found at an earlier stage than its relative lemonwood (another endemic Pittosporum), and usually inhabits less fertile soils.

Predators, Parasites, and Diseases

Insects 

There are over 50 insect species listed in the Plant-SyNZ database that either feed on or parasitise , including wasps, sucking bugs, flies, moths, butterflies, thrips, mites and beetles. There are also more than a dozen beetles that feed on the dead plant material.

Below are some species of interest, organised by feeding habits:

As soon as the weevil's larvae hatch, they start feeding on the stamens and ovaries of the flowers, switching to the leaves once they reach adulthood.

An arrival from Australia, pittosporum shield bug (Monteithiella humeralis) as well as the endemic pittosporum psyllid Trioza vitreoradiata feed only on Pittosporum species, by attaching themselves to a suitable part of the plant and feeding on its sap. The psyllid leaves a trail of characteristic "beads" behind.

Cottony cushion scale (Icerya purchasi), an Australian bug, soft wax scale (Ceroplastes destructor), an import from overseas and the Australian green shield bug (Glaucias amyoti), native to New Zealand despite its name also parasitise the Pittosporum species, but have a more varied range of hosts. All attach themselves to a suitable part of the plant and feed on its sap.

Fungi 

A recently discovered pathogen of  that caused swelling of twigs, the fungus Elsinoe takoropuku, turned out to be a newly discovered species of fungi.

Uses

Garden plant 
 is a popular garden plant in New Zealand and overseas, often used a hedge or as visual backdrop. It is sometimes grown under the cultivar name 'Nigricans', so called because of its black stems. In horticulture it is valued for its coloured foliage (cultivated variations include purple, "silver" and variegated leaves), and for its tolerance of some horticulturally difficult growing conditions, including dry soils and shade (although in northwest Europe, cold and exposed situations do not suit it).

Several hybrids and cultivars have been developed and five varieties won the Royal Horticultural Society's Award of Garden Merit due to their ability to cope in the growing conditions of the United Kingdom:

'Arundel Green' 
'Garnettii' 
'Irene Paterson' 
'Silver Queen' 
'Tom Thumb' 
'Warnham Gold'

Host of threatened wood rose 

 has the potential to be used as the host of the threatened root parasite plant wood rose (Dactylanthus taylorii). Wood rose was recently successfully translocated and sown in the wild from seed, showing the largest success rate when planted in association with kōhūhū.

Use by Māori 
The resin and oils extracted from the leaves have been used for their scent and often mixed with ingredients sourced from other native trees in order to produce an oil of variable composition. The resin is obtained by making cuts in the bark of the tree and the leaves crushed and mixed with other oils. The oil is used to scent little pouches or a dead bird skin, often worn around the neck. The oil is also used to scent houses and mats of people of high rank.

In addition,  has been used for medicinal purposes by Māori. The resin has been mixed with other gums and chewed as a cure for bad breath and sores in the mouth. Parts of the plants have been used as topical treatment for relief of the symptoms of skin diseases. Crushed leaves  also have been used as a poultice for ulcers. The crushed bark has been soaked in water and the resulting mixture used to treat breast or chest ailments, and the remaining liquid taken orally. It has been used, together with flax root, to make a brew used to treat fever, bleeding and bruising. Validating its traditional uses as a medicine, a 2010 study indicated that  does indeed possess some antimicrobial properties.

The branches of  have been used in Māori life ceremonies, such as baptisms, and for welcoming visitors to a marae.

References

External links
Jepson Manual Treatment
USDA Plants Profile

tenuifolium
Trees of New Zealand